The Milwaukee Brewers' 1990 season involved the Brewers' finishing 6th in the American League East with a record of 74 wins and 88 losses.

Offseason
 October 16, 1989: Joey Meyer was released by the Brewers.
 December 3, 1989: Dave Parker was signed as a free agent by the Brewers.
 December 12, 1989: Terry Francona was signed as a free agent by the Brewers.
 December 19, 1989: Robin Yount was signed as a free agent by the Brewers.

Regular season
 April 9, 1990: Pitcher Tony Fossas threw exactly three pitches and recorded three outs. This was accomplished in the sixth inning.
 July 11, 1990: As part of the celebration of Comiskey Park, the Chicago White Sox played a Turn Back the Clock game against the Brewers. The White Sox wore their 1917 home uniforms. This was the first Turn Back the Clock game in the major leagues and started what has become a popular promotion. The club turned off the electronic scoreboards and public address system. They constructed a special manually operated scoreboard in center field for the day and even the grounds-crew wore period costume. General admission tickets were sold for $0.50, popcorn was a nickel, and the stadium organ was shut down for the game.

Season standings

Record vs. opponents

Notable transactions
 April 27, 1990: Terry Francona was released by the Brewers.
 May 23, 1990: Mark Lee was signed as a free agent by the Brewers.
June 9, 1990: Ron Robinson was traded by the Cincinnati Reds with Bob Sebra to the Milwaukee Brewers for Billy Bates and Glenn Braggs.
 August 30, 1990: Charlie O'Brien and a player to be named later were traded by the Brewers to the New York Mets for players to be named later. The Mets sent completed the deal by sending Julio Machado and Kevin Brown to the Brewers on September 7. The Brewers completed the deal by sending Kevin Carmody (minors) to the Mets on September 11.

Roster

Player stats

Batting

Starters by position
Note: Pos = Position; G = Games played; AB = At bats; H = Hits; Avg. = Batting average; HR = Home runs; RBI = Runs batted in

Other batters
Note: G = Games played; AB = At bats; H = Hits; Avg. = Batting average; HR = Home runs; RBI = Runs batted in

Pitching

Starting pitchers 
Note: G = Games pitched; IP = Innings pitched; W = Wins; L = Losses; ERA = Earned run average; SO = Strikeouts

Other pitchers 
Note: G = Games pitched; IP = Innings pitched; W = Wins; L = Losses; ERA = Earned run average; SO = Strikeouts

Relief pitchers 
Note: G = Games pitched; W = Wins; L = Losses; SV = Saves; ERA = Earned run average; SO = Strikeouts

Farm system

The Brewers' farm system consisted of seven minor league affiliates in 1990. The Brewers operated a Dominican Summer League team as a co-op with the Toronto Blue Jays. The Stockton Ports won the California League championship, and the AZL Brewers won the Arizona League championship.

References

1990 Milwaukee Brewers team page at Baseball Reference
1990 Milwaukee Brewers team page at www.baseball-almanac.com

Milwaukee Brewers seasons
Milwaukee Brew
Milwaukee Brewers